Ținutul Jiu (or Ținutul Olt) was one of the ten Romanian ținuturi ("lands") founded in 1938, after King Carol II initiated an institutional reform by modifying the 1923 Constitution and the law of territorial administration. Roughly corresponding to the historical region of Oltenia and named after the Jiu River and the Olt River, it had its capital in the city of Craiova. Ținutul Jiu ceased to exist following the territorial losses of Romania to the Axis powers and the king's abdication in 1940.

Coat of arms
The coat of arms consists of six bars, three of gules and three of or, representing the former seven counties (județe) of Greater Romania (71 in total) which it had included. Over the bars there is an or lion rampant langued and armed sable, facing dexter (the symbol of Oltenia).

Former counties incorporated
After the 1938 Administrative and Constitutional Reform, the older 71 counties lost their authority. 
Dolj County
Gorj County
Mehedinți County
Olt County
Romanați County
Vâlcea County

See also
 Historical administrative divisions of Romania
 Sud-Vest (development region)
 History of Romania

External links
Map

Oltenia
Jiu
1938 establishments in Romania
1940 disestablishments in Romania
States and territories established in 1938
States and territories disestablished in 1940